Bordj Douis or Douis is a small town and commune in Djelfa Province, Algeria. According to the 1998 census it has a population of 10,356. It is located southeast of El Idrissia.

References

Communes of Djelfa Province
Djelfa Province